The Serious and Organised Crime Command (SCD7 – Specialist Crime Directorate 7) was a unit of the Metropolitan Police in Greater London, United Kingdom. It was part of the Specialist Crime Directorate (now Specialist Crime & Operations (SC&O) - created by the merger of Specialist Crime Directorate and Central Operations) and is today part of Met Operations 7 (MO7). It was divided into 10 units:
  
Kidnap Unit - provides fast responses to life-threatening crimes in action, for example extortion, blackmail or kidnap for ransom where the hostage has not been recovered.
Project Team - conducts operations against organised crime, (cross-London, national or international) at National Intelligence Model levels 2–3. This includes proactive contracts to arrest major drugs suppliers, multi-dimensional crime groups, including ethnically composed gangs, and large-scale firearms trafficking.
Branch Intelligence Unit - provides intelligence for the Serious and Organised Crime Group
Flying Squad - investigates robberies (whether armed or not) of cash in transit companies, building societies, betting offices, post offices, jewellers, casinos and banks. They also investigate all robberies at commercial premises where a firearm is produced or intimated.
Hostage and Crisis Negotiation Unit - provides negotiators for all hostage situations, and delivers Hostage and Crisis Negotiation training nationally and internationally.
Central Task Force - investigates class A drug dealers, firearms traffickers and any other criminal group affecting two or more London Boroughs, particularly criminal networks.
Middle Market Drugs Partnership - a joint partnership between the Serious and Organised Crime Group and National Crime Agency. Investigates class A drug supply in London within minimum levels of 1/2 kg of heroin or 1 kg of cocaine, or where an operation will exceed 8 weeks.
Cultural and Communities Research Unit - provides 24-hour support with immediate access to staff of the Met Police that have a broad range of life skills, such as knowledge of a community, language, culture, religion, trade or hobby.
Operation Grafton - investigates criminal networks linked to crime with a value over £10,000 in and around Heathrow Airport, including networks operating across force boundaries.
Specialist Intelligence Service - provides intelligence for the Project Teams.

References

Metropolitan Police units
Organised crime in London